Frustulia is a genus of diatoms belonging to the family Amphipleuraceae.

The genus was first described by Gottlob Ludwig Rabenhorst in 1853.

Species:
 Frustulia rhomboides
 Frustulia vulgaris

References

Naviculales
Diatom genera